T'osan County is a county in North Hwanghae province, North Korea.

Administrative divisions
T'osan county is divided into 1 ŭp (town) and 17 ri (villages):

Counties of North Hwanghae